is a Japanese footballer who plays for Ehime FC from 2023.

Club career
On 18 December 2022, Hiraoka joined to J3 club, Ehime FC for upcoming 2023 season.

Career statistics
Updated to the end 2022 season.

References

External links
Profile at Vegalta Sendai

1986 births
Living people
People from Fujinomiya, Shizuoka
Association football people from Shizuoka Prefecture
Japanese footballers
J1 League players
J2 League players
J3 League players
Shimizu S-Pulse players
Hokkaido Consadole Sapporo players
Vegalta Sendai players
Ehime FC players
Association football defenders